Juan Segundo may refer to:

 Juan Segundo (murderer) (born 1963), American serial killer and rapist
 Juan Luis Segundo (1925–1996), Jesuit priest and theologian